The 17th annual Venice International Film Festival was held from 28 August to 9 September 1956. No Golden Lion was given because there was a tie between The Burmese Harp (Japan) and Calle Mayor (Spain). The international jury was unable to decide the winner and the award was declared void.

Jury
 John Grierson (UK) (head of jury)
 André Bazin (France)
 G. B. Cavallaro (Italy)
 Fridrikh Ermler (Soviet Union)
 James Quinn (UK)
 Kiyohiko Ushihara (Japan)
 Luchino Visconti (Italy)

Films in competition

Awards
Volpi Cup:
 Best Actor - Bourvil (La Traversée de Paris)
 Best Actress - Maria Schell  (Gervaise)
Special Mention - Street of Shame (Kenji Mizoguchi), The Captain from Köpenick (Heinz Rühmann), Suor Letizia (Anna Magnani), L'impero del sole (Franco Bernetti, Mario Craveri, Ubaldo Marelli, Giovanni Raffaldi), Torero! (Carlos Velo), The Immortal Garrison (Zakhar Agranenko & Eduard Tisse), Calle Mayor (Betsy Blair), The Burmese Harp (Kon Ichikawa), Calle Mayor (Juan Antonio Bardem)
New Cinema Award
Best Film - Calle Mayor (Juan Antonio Bardem)
 Best Actor - Heinz Rühmann (The Captain from Köpenick)
Best Actress - Maria Schell  (Gervaise)
San Giorgio Prize
The Burmese Harp (Kon Ichikawa)
FIPRESCI Prize
Calle Mayor (Juan Antonio Bardem)
Gervaise (René Clément)
OCIC Award
Calabuch (Luis García Berlanga)
Honorable Mention - The Burmese Harp (Kon Ichikawa)
Pasinetti Award
Attack (Robert Aldrich)

References

External links
 
 Venice Film Festival 1956 Awards on IMDb

Venice International Film Festival
Venice International Film Festival
Venice Film Festival
1950s in Venice
Venice International Film Festival
Venice International Film Festival